Route 6 (Chinese: 香港六號幹綫) is a partially open trunk route in Hong Kong, planned to be completed in its entirety in 2026. It is the newest trunk route to be numbered under the Strategic Route Number System. The section between Tseung Kwan O and Lam Tin consisting of the new Cross Bay Link and Tseung Kwan O–Lam Tin Tunnel opened to traffic on the 11th of December, 2022. This is the first and so far the only portion of Route 6 which is open. Its eastern terminus is at the Tseung Kwan O Interchange of the Cross Bay Link. Although not officially part of Route 6, the Cross Bay Link carries traffic further to its two eastern termini, one at Po Shun Road in Tseung Kwan O and the other at Wan O Road in LOHAS Park. The western terminus is the unfinished Lam Tin Interchange with the Eastern Harbour Crossing of Route 2 at Lam Tin.

When completed, it will continue from its current terminus at the Lam Tin Interchange through new underground tunnels. First, it will continue in an unnamed submarine tunnel towards the Kai Tak Development Area, intersecting with Route 5 on the way. It will then burrow across Kowloon as part of a new set of underground tunnels forming the Central Kowloon Route till a planned interchange with Route 3 at the West Kowloon Highway near Yau Ma Tei. It was marked as a high-priority trunk route in the Third Comprehensive Transport Study.

The route, when completed, is expected to relieve the congestion problem in Kowloon. It has already fulfilled its secondary purpose to serve as an alternative route for the existing Tseung Kwan O Tunnel.

Exits and Junctions

References

 
Routes in Hong Kong
Proposed roads
Proposed transport infrastructure in Hong Kong